Hyperobject Industries is an American film and television production company founded by director, producer, screenwriter, and comedian Adam McKay in October 2019.

History

Hyperobject Industries was founded in October 2019, by director, producer, screenwriter, and comedian Adam McKay. McKay created the company after leaving Gary Sanchez Productions in April 2019, a production company he co-founded with Will Ferrell in 2006. In October 2019, the company entered an exclusive five-year first-look television deal with Home Box Office, Inc., developing content for HBO and its on demand streaming service, HBO Max.

In November 2019, the company entered a first-look feature film deal with Paramount Pictures. Also in November 2019, Hyperobject Industries formed a multi-year agreement, joint venture with Adam Davidson, Laura Mayer, and Sony Music Entertainment to create Three Uncanny Four Productions, a podcasting company. Hyperobject Industries and the joint venture's partnership will create, develop, produce, and distribute original podcasts.

In July 2021, the company entered an exclusive multi-year first-look production deal, specifically scripted feature films, with Apple Inc.

In December 2021, the company's debut film, Don't Look Up, began its limited theatrical release on December 10, 2021, and begin streaming on Netflix on December 24, 2021. The film became the second most-watched film on Netflix within 28 days of release.

Filmography

Film

Television

Podcast

Notes

References

2019 establishments in California
American companies established in 2019
Companies based in Los Angeles
Film production companies of the United States
Mass media companies established in 2019
Television production companies of the United States